Elections to the Adur District Council were held on 5 May 1988, with one third of the council up for election however no elections were held for the single-member ward St Mary's. Overall turnout dropped to 42.5%.

The election resulted in the new merger Social and Liberal Democrats retaining control of the council.

Election result

This resulted in the following composition of the council:

Ward results

+/- figures represent changes from the last time these wards were contested.

References

1988
1988 English local elections
1980s in West Sussex